Bhupathiraju Somaraju (born 26 July 1946), shortly B. Somaraju, is an Indian cardiologist and was the chairman of CARE Hospitals, Hyderabad. Author of many medical articles in peer reviewed journals and an elected fellow of the National Academy of Medical Sciences, he was honoured by the Government of India, in 2001, with the fourth highest Indian civilian award of Padma Shri.

He has been in the Nizam's Institute of Medical Sciences, Hyderabad, as Professor and Head of the department of Cardiology and Dean of the Institution.

Dr Somaraju, along with his team of cardiologists from CARE Hospitals, had moved to Asian Institute of Gastroenterology, Gachibowli, Hyderabad in the month of October 2019. 

In 1998, Somaraju with A. P. J. Abdul Kalam developed a low cost coronary stent, named the "Kalam-Raju Stent". In 2012, the duo designed a rugged tablet computer for health care in rural areas, which was named the "Kalam-Raju Tablet".

See also

List of Padma Shri award recipients (2000–09)

References

External links
 
 
 

Medical doctors from Andhra Pradesh
Fellows of the National Academy of Medical Sciences
Recipients of the Padma Shri in medicine
People from West Godavari district
1948 births
Living people
20th-century Indian medical doctors
Indian cardiologists
Postgraduate Institute of Medical Education and Research alumni
Andhra University alumni
Academic staff of Nizam's Institute of Medical Sciences